Vishal Chandrasekhar is an Indian film score and soundtrack composer, who has predominantly scored music for Tamil and Telugu films.

Career
Vishal started playing the keyboard aged six and began to give solo shows by the time he was ten years old. He graduated from Anna University with a master's degree in Electronic Media, and worked on over 450 short films and 250 ad jingles, en route to being adjudged the best music director in the Nalaya Iyakkunar show on Kalaignar TV. He subsequently completed the foundation course at the KM Music Conservatory. Vishal made his composing debut with Brindha Das's Hi Da during 2012, with a grand audio launch attended by Gautham Menon during January 2013. Despite having the soundtrack released and a trailer launched, the film failed to have a theatrical release. Vishal got an opportunity to work with Santhosh Sivan for the making of his war film, Inam (2014), and won positive reviews for his work. A critic from NDTV noted "the music helps you connect with the film on an emotional level" and "even though there are three songs included merely to give the film a commercial touch, it's his background score that draws your attention". He also completed work on the Telugu film Hrudayam Ekkadunnadi (2014), while he went on to work on the Tamil science fiction film, Appuchi Gramam (2014), which became noted for its song "En Kannukulle".

Vishal received critical acclaim for his work in Siddharth's Jil Jung Juk (2015), and recorded songs featuring music composers Anirudh Ravichander, Santhosh Narayanan and Sean Roldan in the album. The song "Shoot the Kuruvi" became well noticed, while for another song "Red Roadu", Vishal worked on a mix between 1950s swing and EDM for the tune. He was recently worked on Sawaari and Krishna Gaadi Veera Prema Gaatha featuring Nani. He worked as a music director forSimba.  
He is also venturing into Independent music with Music videos this year. He is working with young technicians and artists in a Music video called Rhythm of life. The video directed by Sam Paul P, starring Ashwin Kumar Lakshmikanthan and lyrics penned by Vishnu Edavan, and has male and female vocals by Yazin Nizar and Kavya Ajith respectively. The track titled Naan Raaman Illai was released by Sony Music Entertainment in May 2017.

His work in the 2022 Telugu film Sita Ramam  received appreciation from audience and critics alike.

Discography

Films

Independent Music Videos

Television

References

External links 
 
 

Living people
Musicians from Chennai
Tamil film score composers
Telugu film score composers
Year of birth missing (living people)